Grant Webb (born 11 August 1979 in Palmerston North, New Zealand) is a New Zealand rugby union player. He plays his rugby as a number eight.

Career
Webb played for Otago, during which time he faced the British and Irish Lions

In 2005 he joined the Toyota Verblitz club in Japan's Top League.  On 20 December 2007 Webb arrived in Belfast on a season long contract with Magners League team Ulster Rugby, following a season playing in New Zealand's NPC tournament, with Hawkes Bay.

In May 2008, he joined Welsh regional side the Newport Gwent Dragons. Webb was released by Newport Gwent Dragons at the end of the 2009–10 season.

References

External links
Newport Gwent Dragons profile
Ulster profile

1979 births
Living people
New Zealand rugby union players
Ulster Rugby players
Dragons RFC players
University of Otago alumni
New Zealand expatriate sportspeople in Wales
Rugby union number eights
Rugby union players from Palmerston North